EPP or Epp may refer to:

Organisations
 European People's Party, a pan-European centre-right conservative and Christian democratic political party
 European People's Party Group, the centre-right political group formed in European parliament by members of the above party
 Engineering and Public Policy, an academic department at Carnegie Mellon University
 Equal Parenting Party, a Canadian political party
 European Public Prosecutor, a proposed EU agency
 Paraguayan People's Army

Science and technology
 Encrypting PIN Pad, a component of an automated teller machine
 End-plate potential, a neuroscience term*
 Endpoint protection platform, in computer security
 Enhanced Parallel Port, a specification of the IEEE 1284 computer peripheral communication standard
 Enhanced Performance Profiles, a PC memory specification
 Erythropoietic protoporphyria, a genetic disorder
 Expanded Polypropylene, a flexible and versatile plastic foam
 Extended projection principle, a linguistic theory
 Extended Power Profile, a 15 W version of the Qi charging standard
 Extensible Provisioning Protocol, an Internet protocol for domain registration

People
 Epp (given name), a feminine given name (including a list of people with the name) 
 Epp (surname), a surname (including a list of people with the name)
 Epp Kaidu, pseudonym of Estonian theatre director and actress Leida Ird (1915–1976)
 Elwood Epp Sell (1897–1961), American Major League Baseball pitcher

Arts
 Epp, a novel by Axel Jensen, published in 1965

Other uses
 Élan Power Products, a subsidiary of Élan Motorsport Technologies
 Enrich Professional Publishing, a publishing house
 Enterprise Platform Programme, an Irish business incubator programme
 European Pallet Pool, for eligible pallets conforming to EUR-pallet
 Export parity price